Nawfal ibn Khuwaylid ibn Asad was one of the non-Muslims who interacted with the Islamic prophet Muhammad.

Biography

Nawfal was the son of Khuwaylid ibn Asad and hence a paternal brother of Khadijah. His mother, known only as "Al-Adawiya", was from the Adiy clan of the Khuza’a tribe.

"He was one of the principal men of the Quraysh." He had the byname "Lion of the Quraysh" and "was well known for his physical strength and bravery."

His son Al-Aswad was an early convert to Islam who joined the migration to Abyssinia in 616. However, Nawfal opposed Muhammad and was known as "a satan of the Quraysh". At one time he bound Abu Bakr and Talha ibn Ubayd-Allah with a rope. Due to this, those two became known as Al-Qareenayn, "the two tied together".

He was killed by Ali during the Battle of Badr in 624. However, according to another tradition, he was killed in the battle by his own nephew, Zubayr ibn al-Awwam.

See also

References

572 births
624 deaths
6th-century Arabs
7th-century Arabs
Opponents of Muhammad
Year of birth unknown
People killed at the Battle of Badr
Banu Asad (Quraysh)